Calvary Chapel Bible College is an evangelical Christian Biblical studies college located at 26409 CA-189 in Twin Peaks, California. The campus relocated to Murrieta Hot Springs in Murrieta, California from 1994 to 2022 before returning to the original Twin Peaks site in July 2022. 
It was founded as a ministry of Calvary Chapel Costa Mesa and operates on a 15-week spring and fall semester schedule.

History
In 1975, Calvary Chapel Bible School was established at the former Monte Vista Resort in Twin Peaks, California. It was originally a "short, intensive residential study program" with a tape-based curriculum consisting primarily of sermons by Calvary Chapel founder Chuck Smith and different speakers.
Courses developed over time to include Biblical expositions, research, commentary, and leading scholarly views. C.C.B.C. now offers full programs leading to two and four-year degrees along with a variety of professional certifications. They additionally have articulation agreements where credits can be transferred to numerous schools including Liberty University, Azusa Pacific University, etc.

Education
An Associate of Theology degree is offered to high school graduates, and Bachelor of Biblical Studies degrees are given to students who complete upper division units along with an associate degree or the equivalent from an accredited college.

Notable alumni
 Jeremy Camp, Christian Singer and Songwriter

Notable faculty 
 Chuck Smith, Calvary Chapel Founder & President
 Joseph Holden, Veritas International University President And Adjunct Faculty

See also
 Higher education accreditation in the United States

References

External links 
 Official Website
 Official Alumni Website
 Calvary Chapel Bible College Affiliate Campuses

Bible colleges
Educational institutions established in 1975
Unaccredited Christian universities and colleges in the United States
Murrieta, California
1975 establishments in California
Bible College